KHOV-FM is a radio station on 105.1 MHz in Wickenburg, Arizona, serving the Phoenix metropolitan area. It is owned by Univision Communications and carries a simulcast of KQMR.

History
KHOV-FM began in 1983 with the callsign KHBC, broadcasting at 105.5 MHz and named for initial owners Hassayampa Broadcasting Corporation. On January 1, 1987, it became KCIW-FM, the FM counterpart to sister station KCIW at 1250 kHz. The country music format of the station continued in 1989 with a callsign change to KRDS-FM. In 1990, KRDS changed formats to Contemporary Christian. KRDS moved from 105.5 to 105.3 MHz and increased its signal from a class A to class B. On March 21, 1997, the format was changed to Adult Standards with a change of call letters to KMYL to complement their "Music of Your Life" slogan and simulcast of KMYL 1190 AM. In 2000, it switched to Spanish hits. In 2001, the station was acquired by Hispanic Broadcasting Corporation, and flipped to a simulcast of KHOT-FM. On January 2, 2013, KHOV-FM switched from a simulcast with KHOT to a simulcast with KQMR, in order to provide coverage of its "La Kalle" Latin Pop format in the West Valley.

On September 28, 2014, KQMR/KHOV rebranded as "100.3 Latino Mix".

In 2016, KHOV applied for an FCC construction permit to move to 105.1 MHz, increase ERP to 46,000 watts and decrease HAAT to 410 meters. KHOV-FM began transmitting from these upgraded facilities on October 20, 2016.

On December 20, 2016, Univision announced that KHOV would soon split from its simulcast and become one of the charter affiliates of Univision Deportes Radio, their new Spanish-language sports network launched in April 2017. The station began to air games of the Arizona Cardinals, Phoenix Suns and Arizona Diamondbacks professional teams. On July 20, 2019, Univision Deportes Radio rebranded as TUDN Radio.

In January 2021, KHOV-FM returned to simulcasting KQMR's Latin Pop format. It splits from the simulcast to air Arizona Diamondbacks games.

On Air Staff

References

External links

Univision Radio Network stations
HOV-FM
Radio stations established in 1988
1988 establishments in Arizona
Contemporary hit radio stations in the United States
Latin rhythmic radio stations